John Calloway Walton (March 6, 1881 – November 25, 1949) was an American politician and the fifth governor of Oklahoma. He served the shortest term of any Governor of Oklahoma, being the first Governor in the state's history to be removed from office.

Following his removal from office, he entered the primary for a seat in the United States Senate, winning the Democratic nomination, but losing to William B. Pine, a Republican. He was elected to the Oklahoma Corporation Commission in 1932 and served until 1939, running for governor again in 1934 and 1938. He died in 1949 and is buried in Rose Hill Cemetery in Oklahoma City.

Early life
John Calloway Walton was born on March 6, 1881, in Greensboro, Indiana. He spent six years in Indianapolis before his family moved to Lincoln, Nebraska. At the age of sixteen, Walton joined the United States Army in 1897, and served for six years. Walton did not see combat service during the Spanish–American War; however he did serve at a post in Mexico for some time.

Following his discharge from the Army in 1903, Walton traveled to Oklahoma Territory to make his life as a contractor in the field of civil engineering. Walton set up his practice in the thriving metropolis of Oklahoma City. Walton lived in Oklahoma City when Oklahoma was officially admitted to the Union on November 16, 1907, and saw the capital moved from Guthrie, Oklahoma to Oklahoma City in 1910.

Walton joined the Democratic Party and  became an active participant in the state's political matters. In 1917, under the Robert L. Williams administration, Walton was elected to his first political office. Due to his engineering experience, Walton easily won election to the office of Commissioner of Public Works of Oklahoma City. Due to his success in that office, two years later Walton was elected as the mayor of Oklahoma City, a post he served in until 1923.

Before his term as mayor ended, Walton entered his name in the Democratic primary as a candidate for Governor of Oklahoma to succeed James B. A. Robertson. After winning the Democratic nomination Walton travelled around the state giving the most colorful and liveliest speeches and campaign platforms in Oklahoma's history until that point. In the general election, Walton was successful in his bid (despite an advertising campaign by conservative Democrats accusing him of "Sovietism" and "state Socialism"), and his inauguration and inaugural ball were just as lively as his campaign.

Governor of Oklahoma
Walton was inaugurated as the fifth Governor of Oklahoma on January 9, 1923. Walton represented the progressive wing of the Democratic Party and his policies reflected this. Despite this, many of the programs in his domestic policy (the Reconstruction League) were accepted by the Oklahoma Legislature and 1923 proved to be one of the most progressive legislative sessions in the state's history. Among Walton's reforms were an expanded farm cooperative program to aid troubled farms, a revision of the Workman's Compensation Law for improved benefits to employees, and stronger warehouse inspection laws to satisfy Oklahoma's cotton and wheat farmers.

Walton looked to his predecessor Robertson for many ideas of his administration. Just as education had been a large part of Robertson's programs, so it became with Walton. Walton passed through the Legislature Oklahoma's first program to allow free text books to all students in Oklahoma's schools and a grant of over $1,000,000 in state funds to aid weak schools. In true progressive manner, Walton instituted harsher penalties for breaking state laws and regulations, increased spending on welfare programs, and instituted a farm stabilization program under the supervision of the State Board of Agriculture.

Walton's troubles first began when he began to flip-flop between those progressives who supported his programs and those conservatives who did not. Walton began to lose control of the Legislature and by trying to appeal to both sides, lost all support. Hoping to regain his lost support, Walton attempted to gain factional support by making appointments of the faction leaders to the higher level government and educational positions. Though he would see minor success in this venture, in the long term this proved to be ineffective.

By 1921, the white racist Ku Klux Klan had grown to dangerous levels of power, which resulted in the Tulsa Race Massacre in which angry whites raged through black neighborhoods, beating and killing. As many as  ten thousand were left homeless with "the official count of 36" dead.  The violence continued during Walton's administration. In order to crack down on the Klan, Walton declared martial law in Okmulgee and Tulsa counties, and the suspended the writ of habeas corpus in Tulsa County.

Impeachment and removal
Walton's main opponents in Oklahoma politics were "disappointed office-seekers, the klan, and the school bloc" according to a 1930 study.

The Oklahoma Constitution strictly forbade any member of the state government from suspending this writ and the legislature was outraged by Governor Walton's action. In response, a grand jury was established in Oklahoma City and charged with investigating. Following the announcement of the creation of the grand jury, on September 15, 1923, Walton declared "absolute martial law" for the entire state. Impeachment demands filled the State Capitol and the leaders of the House of Representatives and Senate acted by calling a special session on October 2.

Hoping to prevent the impeachment charges from being carried out, Walton called the Legislature into a special session of his own on October 11 with the topic being the KKK. The Legislature refused to meet and recessed until October 17 when impeachment charges could be organized. Under the supervision of the Speaker of the House William Dalton McBee, the House brought twenty-two charges against Walton, and voted for impeachment. Soon after, on October 23, Walton was suspended in his office as Governor and  Lieutenant Governor Martin E. Trapp became acting Governor.

Representative Wesley E. Disney (D-Tulsa), acted as the prosecutor in the Senate, which oversaw his impeachment trial its function as the Court of Impeachment. His impeachment trial in the Senate was presided over by the chief justice of the Oklahoma Supreme Court. Of the House's twenty-two charges, eleven were sustained, including "illegal collection of campaign funds, padding the public payroll, suspension of habeas corpus, excessive use of the pardon power, and general incompetence." On November 19, 1923, Walton was convicted and removed from office. Lieutenant Governor Trapp succeeded Walton and became the sixth Governor of Oklahoma on the same day.

The impeachment is said to have "frightened" the state "into a system of preferential voting as an escape from minority nominations." Walton received only "an extremely small per cent of the total votes cast" in the Democratic primary, yet was still selected as the Democratic candidate. This perceived injustice induced  the Legislature to adopt a different electoral system. Eventually, they created the primary electoral system in the state.

Later political activity and death
In 1924, the year after Walton's removal from office, U.S. Senator Robert L. Owen retired; he had represented Oklahoma in the Senate since it became a state in 1907. Walton promptly entered the primary for Senator and won the Democratic nomination with just 30% of the vote, narrowly defeating Rep. E. B. Howard. Walton may have won the nomination so soon after his removal from office because he was the only Democratic candidate to criticize the Klan publicly. However, Walton lost in the general election in a landslide (62% to 35%) to Republican William B. Pine.  Leading Democrats in the state responded by enacting a ranked-choice voting scheme that required voters to support second and third choices in order for their ballots to count, a provision that resulted in the primary electoral system being ruled unconstitutional. After that legislation was passed to implement the run-off system that is in place in the state today.

In 1932, Walton was elected to the Oklahoma Corporation Commission, and served from 1933 to 1939.

In 1934, and again in 1938, he ran for Governor, losing both times in Democratic primary.

After his service as Commissioner, Walton retired from political office. He spent his remaining years practicing law in Oklahoma City, where he died at the age of 68 on November 25, 1949. He is buried in Rose Hill Cemetery in Oklahoma City.

State of the State Speech
First and only State of the State Speech

References

Further reading
 Brad L. Duren, "'Klanspiracy' or Despotism? The Rise and Fall of Governor Jack Walton, Featuring W. D. McBee," Chronicles of Oklahoma 2002–03 80(4): 468–485.

External links
 

|-

|-

|-

1881 births
1949 deaths
20th-century American lawyers
20th-century American politicians
Democratic Party governors of Oklahoma
Impeached United States officials removed from office by state or territorial governments
Lawyers from Oklahoma City
Oklahoma lawyers
Politicians from Indianapolis
Politicians from Oklahoma City
Impeached governors removed from office